The following is a list of Australian films that have been, or will be, released in 2022.

Films

See also 
 2022 in Australia
 2022 in Australian television
 List of Australian films of 2023

References 

2022
Australian
 Films